Eymet is a commune in the Dordogne department in Nouvelle-Aquitaine in southwestern France.

It is notable as a popular location amongst English speaking immigrants, who account for ten per cent of the local population.

Geography
Eymet is situated in the Périgord region, on the river Dropt.

The Bastide was founded in 1270, by Alphonse de Poitiers, Count of Toulouse and brother of Louis IX of France.

Popular culture
During the summer of 2011, a TV production company filmed a series of reality TV programmes describing the life of various British expatriates now living in the Dordogne, with an emphasis on Eymet. The series was first shown in autumn 2011, on Monday evenings on ITV1, as twelve 30-minute episodes under the title Little England. Although it explored much of the region, some commentators found it less than exciting. Despite that, a second series was filmed in summer 2012, mainly in the area north of the Dordogne river and shown in autumn 2012 on UK's ITV.

Population

Twin cities — sister cities
Eymet is twinned with:

  Grumello del Monte, Italy (2006)
  North Hatley, Quebec, Canada (2008)

Gallery

See also
Communes of the Dordogne department

References

External links

Communes of Dordogne
Dordogne communes articles needing translation from French Wikipedia
British diaspora in Europe